Central Taurus Sign Language (CTSL) is a village sign language of Turkey. It is spoken in three villages in the central Taurus Mountains. It was brought to the world's attention by Rabia Ergin, who was exposed to it growing up.

External links
 Rabia Ergin's webpage
 www.notmute.com
 www.dilsizdegil.com

References

Village sign languages
Sign languages of Turkey